is a railway station in the city of Iwaki, Fukushima, Japan, operated by East Japan Railway Company (JR East).

Lines

Station layout
The station has two opposed side platforms connected to the station building by a footbridge. The station is unattended.

Platforms

History
Suetsugi Station opened on June 1, 1947. The station was absorbed into the JR East network upon the privatization of the Japanese National Railways (JNR) on April 1, 1987.   From March 11 to October 10, 2011, following the Great East Japan earthquake and the Fukushima Daiichi nuclear disaster, train services were replaced by a bus operation.

Surrounding area

See also
 List of railway stations in Japan

External links

References

Stations of East Japan Railway Company
Railway stations in Fukushima Prefecture
Jōban Line
Railway stations in Japan opened in 1947
Iwaki, Fukushima